Xenochaetina is a genus of flies in the family Lauxaniidae. There are about 11 described species in Xenochaetina.

Species
Xenochaetina aeneoides Hendel, 1932
Xenochaetina crassimana Malloch, 1926
Xenochaetina ferruginosa Hendel, 1926
Xenochaetina flavipennis (Fabricius, 1805)
Xenochaetina leucostoma Hendel, 1936
Xenochaetina opaca Hendel, 1936
Xenochaetina pallida Malloch, 1923
Xenochaetina polita Malloch, 1925
Xenochaetina porcaria (Fabricius, 1805)
Xenochaetina setitibia Malloch, 1925

References

External links

 

Lauxaniidae
Lauxanioidea genera
Diptera of North America
Diptera of South America